Fritz Otto Bernert was a German fighter ace of the First World War, notable for shooting down five enemy airplanes in 20 minutes. Invalided from infantry service after suffering four wounds, he turned to aviation service. Despite wearing pince-nez and having the use of only one arm, he became a pilot. After his first victory with Kampfeinsitzerkommando Vaux, he switched to Jagdstaffel 4, scoring six more victories during 1916. In 1917, he claimed an additional 20 victories between March and May 1917.

The victory list

This list is complete for entries, though obviously not for all details. Doubled lines in list marks transition between units. Data was abstracted from Above the Lines: The Aces and Fighter Units of the German Air Service, Naval Air Service and Flanders Marine Corps, 1914–1918, ,p. 70, and from The Aerodrome webpage  Abbreviations from those sources were expanded by editor creating this list.

References

Aerial victories of Bernert, Fritz Otto
Bernert, Fritz Otto